Coleophora cycnea is a moth of the family Coleophoridae.

References

cycnea
Moths described in 1995